Gagarin, known until 1968 as Gzhatsk, is a town and the administrative centre of Gagarinsky District of Smolensk Oblast, Russia, located on the Gzhat River,  northeast of Smolensk, the administrative centre of the oblast. Population: 

The town's former name is from that of the Gzhat River, which is of Baltic origin (cf. Old Prussian gudde, meaning "forest").

Climate
Gagarin has a warm-summer humid continental climate (Dfb in the Köppen climate classification).

<div style="width:70%;">

History
In 1718, a village on the territory of modern Gagarin was transformed by a decree of Peter the Great to a transshipment landing stage (called Gzhatsky landing stage). From the mid-18th century, Gzhatsk was a sloboda, and in 1776, by a decree by Catherine the Great, it was granted uyezd town status and a coat of arms showing "a barge loaded with bread ready for departure, on a field argent", meaning that the town was a good landing stage for grain.

The town was built at the crossing of the Moscow road (east-west) and the Smolensk road (north-south, paralleling the river). By the plan of 1773, it was laid out in triangular form. One part paralleled the Gzhat River, another—the road to Moscow, and the base of the triangle connected them.

On August 29, 1812, in the village of Tsaryovo-Zaymishche near Gzhatsk, Mikhail Kutuzov accepted command of the Russian army. On the day of Napoleon's invasion, the town was set on fire and burned for several days. It was near Gzhatsk where Denis Davydov's guerrilla group started to operate. Russian troops entered the town again on November 2, 1812. When the town was rebuilt in 1817, the former regular layout was basically kept.

On , 1917, Soviet power was proclaimed in Gzhatsk and its uyezd. A year later, there was a counterrevolutionary insurrection.

During World War II, the town housed a flax factory, a sawmill, a brickyard, a roller-mill, a bakehouse complex, a weaving factory, a power station, and a number of guilds. In the course of the war, Gzhatsk was occupied by the German Army from October 9, 1941 until March 6, 1943, when it was liberated by the troops of the Soviet Western Front.

In 1968, the town was renamed Gagarin in honor of the first person to travel into space, Yuri Gagarin, who was born in 1934 in the nearby village of Klushino.

Administrative and municipal status
Within the framework of administrative divisions, Gagarin serves as the administrative center of Gagarinsky District. As an administrative division, it is, together with one rural locality (the settlement of Trufany), incorporated within Gagarinsky District as Gagarinskoye Urban Settlement. As a municipal division, this administrative unit also has urban settlement status and is a part of Gagarinsky Municipal District.

International relations

Gagarin is twinned with:

 Barysaw, Belarus
 Krupki, Belarus
 Orsha, Belarus
 Ratingen, Germany

References

Notes

Sources

External links

Official website of Gagarin 
Gagarin Business Directory 

Cities and towns in Smolensk Oblast
Populated places established in 1719
1719 establishments in Russia
Gzhatsky Uyezd
Yuri Gagarin
Monuments and memorials to Yuri Gagarin